Leigh Harrison may refer to:

Leigh Harrison, musician in Kids Love Lies
Leigh Harrison, character in Mr. Monk and the Airplane

See also
Lee Harrison (disambiguation)